The Alpstein are a subgroup of the Appenzell Alps in Switzerland. The Alpstein massif is in Appenzell Innerrhoden, Appenzell Ausserrhoden and St. Gallen.

Despite it being rather low when compared to other Alpine peaks – the highest mountain is the Säntis at 2502 metres – the Alpstein, due to their northern "outpost" position only a short distance from Lake Constance (nearly 30 km) are relatively tall when compared to the surrounding area. The range also includes the Altenalp Türm as the northernmost summit above 2,000 metres in Switzerland.

Description 
Geologically, the Alpstein massif is different from the predominantly granitic central Alps. Alpstein are predominantly limestone massif and thus represents a kind of western continuation of the eastern ranges, running between Germany and Austria.

Because of erosions, numerous cracks, caves and sinkholes which prevail in the limestone, two of the three lakes have no surface drainage: the water of the Fälensees flows by the mountain ridge southwest into the Rhine.

Morphologically, there are three main tectonic folds running from southwest to northeast. Only the Lisengrat, the connection between the two peaks Säntis Altman runs perpendicular to the main ridge. Between these mountain ranges are embedded in

External links 

 Interactive spherical panorama tour through the Alpstein

Mountain ranges of Switzerland
Appenzell Alps